Ražanj is a village and municipality located in the Nišava District of southern Serbia. The municipality consists of 23 settlements having a total population of 9,150 inhabitants, with 1,245 inhabitants living in Ražanj itself.

Etymology
In Serbian, "ražanj" means "stake". In Roman times it was called Cametas.

History
From 1929 to 1941, Ražanj was part of the Morava Banovina of the Kingdom of Yugoslavia.

Demographics

According to the last official census done in 2011, the municipality of Ražanj has 9,150 inhabitants.

Ethnic groups
The ethnic composition of the municipality:

Infrastructure
The main transport routes crossing the territories of the municipality of Ražanj are the Belgrade-Niš Highway as well as the Belgrade-Niš Railway. The Belgrade-Niš highway is a national key transport route and accordingly a vital transport route for the people living in the municipality of Ražanj. Two railroad stations are located within the area of the municipality (Braljina and Đunis). These are connected to the Serbian railroad network through the Belgrade-Niš railroad.

Economy
There are 62 companies currently present in the municipality of Ražanj. The majority of these are small firms, employing between 1 and 5 workers, while the rest are companies with 5 to 50 workers employed. The level of unemployment is higher in the municipality of Ražanj than in the other municipalities of the Nišava District. In addition, net earnings are about 26% lower than the national average of the Republic of Serbia. These numbers are partly explained by the fact that the municipality of Ražanj has a relatively old population (about 32% of the rural population are older than 60 years).

According to the National Bureau of Statistics, in 2007, 1,008 people were employed by state owned companies and institutions, 812 were employed by other organizations and 196 were self-employed.

Agriculture
Agriculture is the biggest economy sector in the municipality and currently 5,594 people (49% of the total population) work in agriculture. The major part of the territory of the municipality of Ražanj is covered by arable areas, woodlands come second, fields and meadows come third and then fruit farms and vineyards. The agricultural land covers 59.6% (16,926 ha) of the total territory and is the central economy sector of the region. Main crops are maize, wheat, barley and oat. Arable areas cover 72.92% of the total agricultural area while the rest are covered by fruit farms (5.02%), vineyards (3.22%) and fields and meadows (16.91%). According to 2007 figures, the territory of the municipality Ražanj had a cattle population of about 4,000 heads, a swine population of 13,000 heads, a goat and sheep population of 3,500 animals, and a poultry population of about 65,000 hens.

Even if agriculture today is the primary economy sector of the municipality, it has great future potentials only by making it more market-oriented and efficient. On the territory of the municipality Razanj there are currently more than 1520 registered farms. According to the National Bureau of Statistics, in 2007, 96.60% of the land was privately owned while 2.85% was owned by the state.

Economic figures
The following table gives a preview of total number of employed people per their core activity (as of 2017):

See also
 Nišava District
 Subdivisions of Serbia

References

External links 

 

Populated places in Nišava District
Municipalities and cities of Southern and Eastern Serbia
Roman towns and cities in Serbia